The 2008 Canadian Championship (officially the Nutrilite Canadian Championship for sponsorship reasons) was the first edition of the Canadian Championship – Canada's domestic cup competition. The soccer tournament took place in the cities of Montreal, Toronto and Vancouver from May to July, 2008. 

The tournament consisted of a home and away series between each team for a total of six games. Participating teams were the Montreal Impact, Toronto FC, and the Vancouver Whitecaps. The winner of the tournament, Montreal, gained entry into the qualifying round of the 2008–09 CONCACAF Champions League, where they played against the Nicaraguan representative Real Estelí in a home and away series to determine entrance to the group stages.

The Montreal Impact were awarded the Voyageurs Cup trophy as winners of the tournament, the seventh occasion it had been presented.

Media coverage
The 2008 Canadian Championship was broadcast by the CBC. Games were broadcast on CBC Bold and online at CBC Sports. Nigel Reed and Jason de Vos  provided commentary for the games.

Standings

Schedule

Top goalscorers

References

2008
2008 in Canadian soccer
2008 domestic association football cups